Justin S. Grant is an American author and singer-songwriter from Santa Barbara, California.

Early life and musical beginnings 

In 2020, he was seen on FOX4 and KTNV talking about his books about spirituality.

Music career 
American Top 40 reported that he entered the Shazam charts in Buffalo, Minnesota and New York.

See also 

 List of American musicians
 Best-selling authors

References 

Living people
Year of birth missing (living people)
Book artists
American male singer-songwriters